Muhammad Amirul Ashraf bin Ariffin (born 22 January 1998) is a Malaysian footballer who plays as a 
centre-back for Sarawak United in Malaysia Super League.

Club career

Early years
Born in Selangor, Amirul Ashraf played for Malaysia Pahang Sports School (MPSS) from 2013 to 2014. After that, he joined Frenz United temporarily to develop his talent before move to Selangor's youth team in 2016. He also was one of the players representing the Selangor football in sporting events (Sukma) in Sarawak.

Selangor

In December 2016, Coach Selangor P. Maniam confirmed that Amirul Ashraf would be definitely promoted to Selangor's first team in 2017 season.

Career statistics

Club

1 Includes AFC Cup and AFC Champions League.

References

External links
 Profile at faselangor.my

1998 births
Living people
Malaysian footballers
Selangor FA players
Malaysia Super League players
Malaysian people of Malay descent
People from Selangor
Association football defenders
Malaysia youth international footballers